Hegelians may refer to:

 Right Hegelians
 Young Hegelians (Left Hegelians)
 Hegelianism
 Neo-Hegelianism